Rodney Olav Riise (21 December 1942 – 31 December 2009) was a Norwegian ice hockey player. He was born in Oslo, Norway and represented the club Vålerengens IF. He played for the Norwegian national ice hockey team, and  participated at the Winter Olympics in Grenoble in 1968, where the Norwegian team placed 11th.

References

1942 births
2009 deaths
Ice hockey players at the 1968 Winter Olympics
Norwegian ice hockey players
Olympic ice hockey players of Norway
Ice hockey people from Oslo